Alexandre Llovet (born 26 November 1997), is a French and Swiss professional footballer who plays for the Championnat National 2 club Marignane Gignac as a forward.

Professional career
Llovet made his professional debut for Montpellier in a 1–1 Ligue 1 tie with Toulouse FC on 30 November 2016.

References

External links
 
 
 Maxifoot Profile
 Sofoot Profile
 Alexandre Llovet at MHSC

Living people
1997 births
Footballers from Marseille
Association football forwards
French footballers
French expatriate footballers
Montpellier HSC players
FC Lusitanos players
Racing Besançon players
Marignane Gignac Côte Bleue FC players
Ligue 2 players
Championnat National 2 players
Championnat National 3 players
French expatriate sportspeople in Andorra
Expatriate footballers in Andorra